Local elections were held in Marikina on May 9, 2016, as part of the Philippine general election. Held concurrently with the national elections, the electorate voted to elect a mayor, a vice mayor, sixteen city council members and two district representatives to congress. Those elected took their respective offices on June 30, 2016, for a three-year-long term. 181,019 out of 217,711 registered voters voted in this election.

Outgoing Representative Marcelino Teodoro was elected to the mayoralty, defeating incumbent mayor Del De Guzman. In a rematch for the vice mayoralty, Jose Fabian Cadiz was re-elected for a third term as mayor, defeating former vice mayor Marion Andres. The Liberal Party, despite losing the mayoralty maintained their majority in the City Council, winning 12 seats in the legislature. The Nationalist People's Coalition gained four seats in the city council.

Bayani Fernando and Miro Quimbo were elected as the representatives for the first and second districts respectively, with the former being elected for his first term and the latter being re-elected for his third.

Background
In the 2013 elections, Del de Guzman and Jose Fabian Cadiz were re-elected to the mayoralty and vice mayoralty respectively.

De Guzman sought a third term as mayor, facing a challenge from the outgoing representative from the first district Marcelino Teodoro. Incumbent Mayor Jose Fabian Cadiz was once again challenged by former mayor Marion Andres.

Mayoral Election 
The incumbent mayor is Del De Guzman, who was re-elected in 2013 with 88.21% of the vote.

De Guzman's sole opponent is the incumbent representative from the first district Marcelino Teodoro.

Candidates 

 Del De Guzman (Liberal), Mayor of Marikina (2010 - 2016) Representative for the Lone District, then 2nd District (2001 - 2010)
 Marcelino Teodoro (NPC), Representative for the 1st District (2007 - 2016)

Results

Vice Mayoral Election 
The incumbent is mayor is Jose Fabian Cadiz, who was re-elected in 2013 with 55.32% of the vote.

In a rematch, Cadiz's sole opponent is former mayor Marion Andres, who had previously challenged Cadiz for the vice mayoralty in 2013.

Candidates 

 Jose Fabian Cadiz (Liberal), Vice Mayor of Marikina (2010 - 2019)
 Marion Andres (NPC), Vice Mayor of Marikina (2001 - 2010)

Results

House of Representatives Elections 
Held concurrently with the local elections, two representatives from the city's congressional districts were elected to represent their respective districts in the House of Representatives. In the 2013 elections Marcelino Teodoro and Miro Quimbo were elected to represent the first and second districts respectively. Both representatives are in the majority bloc.

First District
The incumbent representative is Marcelino Teodoro, who was re-elected in 2013 with 89.54% of the vote. Teodoro is term-limited and challenged incumbent mayor Del De Guzman in the mayoral race.

Former Mayor and MMDA Chairman Bayani Fernando was nominated by Nationalist People's Coalition to run for this seat. On the other hand the Liberal Party slated Councilor Samuel Ferriol to challenge Fernando for the seat. Ipaglaban Mo! host Jopet Sison also ran for the seat as an independent candidate.

Candidates 

 Bayani Fernando (NPC), Mayor of Marikina (1992 - 2001) MMDA Chairman (2002 - 2009)
 Samuel Ferriol (Liberal), Councilor for the 1st District (2010 - 2019)
 Jopet Sison (Independent), Lawyer and Ipaglaban Mo! host

Results

Second District
The incumbent representative is Miro Quimbo, who was re-elected in 2013 with 88.57% of the vote. Quimbo is running unopposed.

Candidate 

 Miro Quimbo (Liberal) Incumbent Representative (2010 - 2019)

Results

City Council Elections

1st District 

|-bgcolor=black
|colspan=8|

2nd District 

|-bgcolor=black
|colspan=8|

References

2016 Philippine local elections
Elections in Marikina
Politics of Marikina
2016 elections in Metro Manila